There are many varieties of websites, each specializing in a particular type of content or use, and they may be arbitrarily classified in any number of ways.

Some websites may be included in one or more of these categories. For example, a business website may promote the business's products, but may also host informative documents, such as white papers. There are also numerous sub-categories to the ones listed above. For example, a porn site is a specific type of e-commerce site or business site (that is, it is trying to sell memberships for access to its site) or have social networking capabilities. A fansite may be a dedication from the owner to a particular celebrity. Websites are constrained by architectural limits (e.g., the computing power dedicated to the website). Very large websites, such as Facebook, Yahoo!, Microsoft, and Google employ many servers and load balancing equipment such as Cisco Content Services Switches to distribute visitor loads over multiple computers at multiple locations.  As of early 2011, Facebook utilized 9 data centers with approximately 63,000 servers.

A general website is a website that covers a broad range of topics or interests, rather than focusing on a specific niche or industry.

See also 
Lists of websites
List of most visited websites

References 

types of websites